Callichilia barteri grows as a shrub up to  tall. Its fragrant flowers feature a white corolla. Habitat is in forests. Local medicinal uses include as a treatment for gonorrhoea and as an anthelmintic and childhood laxative. C. barteri is found in Togo, Benin, Nigeria, Cameroon, the Republic of Congo and the Democratic Republic of Congo.

References

barteri
Plants used in traditional African medicine
Flora of Togo
Flora of Benin
Flora of Nigeria
Flora of the Republic of the Congo
Flora of the Democratic Republic of the Congo
Flora of West-Central Tropical Africa
Plants described in 1870